In mathematics, an open cover of a topological space  is a family of open subsets such that  is the union of all of the open sets. A good cover is an open cover in which all sets and all non-empty intersections of finitely-many sets are contractible .

Application
A major reason for the notion of a good cover is that the Leray spectral sequence of a fiber bundle degenerates for a good cover, and so the Čech cohomology associated with a good cover is the same as the Čech cohomology of the space. (Such a cover is known as a Leray cover.) However, for the purposes of computing the Čech cohomology it suffices to have a more relaxed definition of a good cover in which all intersections of finitely many open sets have contractible connected components. This follows from the fact that higher derived functors can be computed using acyclic resolutions.

Example

The two-dimensional surface of a sphere  has an open cover by two contractible sets, open neighborhoods of opposite hemispheres. However these two sets have an intersection that forms a non-contractible equatorial band. To form a good cover for this surface, one needs at least four open sets. A good cover can be formed by projecting the faces of a tetrahedron onto a sphere in which it is inscribed, and taking an open neighborhood of each face. The more relaxed definition of a good cover allows us to do this using only three open sets. A cover can be formed by choosing two diametrically opposite points on the sphere, drawing three non-intersecting segments lying on the sphere connecting them and taking open neighborhoods of the resulting faces.

References
, §5, S. 42.

Algebraic topology
Cohomology theories
Homology theory